Michael J. O’Hara is an American author, screenwriter and producer.

Early life 
O’Hara was born in New York City and raised in the Inwood section of Northern Manhattan. He graduated with a B.A. in English and Government from Manhattan College.

Career 
After college, O’Hara worked as a political reporter for two Gannett newspapers (The Titusville Star Advocate and Cocoa Today).

He moved to Hollywood in the late 1970s and ended up working in the press department at NBC, becoming NBC’s V.P. of West Coast Publicity and, later, an executive producer and screenwriter.

His first novel, Dos Angeles, was published in the fall of 2015.

Filmography

Writer

Television Series 
 Chicago Story: Not Quite Paradise: Part 1 - 1982
 Chicago Story: Not Quite Paradise: Part 2 - 1982
 Murder in the Heartland (Mini-Series) - 1993

Television Movies 
 Those She Left Behind - 1989
 She Said No - 1990
 Switched at Birth - 1991
 She Woke Up Pregnant - 1996
 One Hot Summer Night - 1998
 In His Life: The John Lennon Story - 2000
 1st to Die - 2003

Executive Producer

Television Series 
 Murder in the Heartland - 1993

Television Movies 
 She Said No - 1990
 Switched at Birth - 1991
 Bloodlines: Murder in the Family - 1993
 Moment of Truth: Stalking Back - 1993
 Moment of Truth: To Walk Again - 1994
 Moment of Truth: Broken Pledges - 1994
 Moment of Truth: Cradle of Conspiracy - 1994
 Heart of a Child - 1994
 Twilight Zone: Rod Serling's Lost Classics - 1994
 Moment of Truth: Caught in the Crossfire - 1994
 Moment of Truth: Cult Rescue - 1994
 The Other Mother: A Moment of Truth Movie - 1995
 Deceived by Trust: A Moment of Truth Movie - 1995
 Eye of the Stalker - 1995
 Justice for Annie: A Moment of Truth Movie - 1996
 A Secret Between Friends: A Moment of Truth Movie - 1996
 She Woke Up Pregnant - 1996
 Abduction of Innocence - 1996
 Badge of Betrayal - 1997
 A Child's Wish - 1997
 Moment of Truth: Into the Arms of Danger - 1997
 The Accident: A Moment of Truth Movie - 1997
 Shattered Hearts: A Moment of Truth Movie - 1998
 I Know What You Did - 1998
 Playing to Win: A Moment of Truth Movie - 1998
 One Hot Summer Night - 1998
 Nobody Lives Forever - 1998
 Broken Silence: A Moment of Truth Movie - 1998
 Someone to Love Me - 1998
 In His Life: The John Lennon Story - 2000
 1st to Die - 2003

Awards 
Besides an Emmy nomination ("Switched at Birth"), other honors include: a Christopher Award (“A Child’s Wish”); a Prism Award (“The Accident”); and the Media Award from The National Council on Problem Gambling (“Playing to Win.”)

Personal life 
O’Hara and his wife Doris live in Malibu, California. They have two children, Mariah and John.

References 

American male writers
American male screenwriters
Television producers from New York City
Year of birth missing (living people)
Living people
Writers from New York City
Manhattan College alumni
American television writers
Screenwriters from New York (state)
American male television writers